The Iranian Super Cup (Persian: سوپر جام ایران, Super Jam-e 'Iran) is an Iranian association football trophy awarded to the winner of a match between the Persian Gulf Pro League's season champion and the winner of the Hazfi Cup. It is similar to numerous other Super Cup tournaments held in other countries.

The tournament was only held once in 2005 when Hazfi Cup champions Saba Battery defeated league champions Foolad 4–0.

The next edition of the Iranian Super Cup was planned to be played on 10 August 2007 between the 2006–07 league champions Saipa and the Hazfi Cup winners Sepahan but the match was cancelled. After Mehdi Taj was elected as Federation president in 2016, the Iranian Super Cup was restarted. Zob Ahan won the first Super Cup after its restart, beating 2015–16 Persian Gulf Pro League winners Esteghlal Khuzestan 4–2 after extra time. Next year Persepolis crowned Super Cup by beating Naft Tehran in Azadi Stadium.

Participating clubs
In the normal circumstances, following clubs participate:
Defending Persian Gulf Pro League Champions
Defending Hazfi Cup winners

If a team also be the Persian Gulf Pro League and Hazfi Cup champion, they will become the Super Cup champion.

Competition format
One 90-minute game
If tied, extra time and then penalties decide the winner.

Winners

Key

Finals

Performances

Performance by representative

All-time top goalscorers

Bold indicates active players in Iranian football.

Winning managers

Notes

References

External links
 Iran - List of Cup Finals since 1991, RSSSF.com
 all winners worldfootball.net

2
Iran